The Soviet Union men's national under 20 ice hockey team was the national under-20 ice hockey team in the Soviet Union. The team represented the Soviet Union at the International Ice Hockey Federation's IIHF World U20 Championship. The team has won eleven gold medals (first three unofficial, once more as CIS), three silver medals, and two bronze medals at the World U20 Championships. 

At the 1987 World Junior Ice Hockey Championships, the team was disqualified as a result of the Punch-up in Piestany versus the Canada men's national junior ice hockey team. Soviet administrator Yuri Korolev expressed regret that the incident occurred but did not admit any guilt. He felt that the game should have been finished instead of both teams being disqualified from the tournament.

World Junior Championships

 1974 –  (Unofficial tournament)
 1975 –  (Unofficial tournament)
 1976 –  (Unofficial tournament)
 1977 – 
 1978 – 
 1979 – 
 1980 – 
 1981 – 
 1982 – 4th place
 1983 – 
 1984 – 
 1985 – 
 1986 – 
 1987 – Disqualified
 1988 – 
 1989 – 
 1990 – 
 1991 – 
 1992 –  (as )

References

Junior national ice hockey teams
Junior
Youth sport in the Soviet Union